Chalk Farm is a small urban district of north London, lying immediately north of Camden Town, in the London Borough of Camden.

History

Manor of Rugmere
Chalk Farm was originally known as the Manor of Rugmere, an estate that was mentioned in the Domesday Book of 1086. The manor was one of five which made up the large Ancient Parish of St Pancras. Rugmere is thought to mean the Woodcock's Pool.

Henry VIII bought part of the manor, detaching it to form the north-eastern part of what would become Regent's Park, the remainder subsequently become more commonly known as Chalk Farm. Both the detached area and the remainder remained part of the parish of St Pancras.

In 1786 the estate was sold to Charles FitzRoy, 1st Baron Southampton, it was described as commonly known as Chalk Farm. The term Rugmere (or Rug Moor) appeared to have endured for some time as a field name.

Etymology

The origin of the name is disputed: it certainly does not derive from the soil, as the area is built on London Clay. The consensus view is that "Chalk Farm" derives from Middle English Chaldecote or Caldecote, a common English toponym meaning "cold cottage" first attested in the area of Chalk Farm in 1256. This had become Chalcotts by the 16th century, and Chalk by 1746. The full form "Chalk Farm" is a 19th-century coinage, though "Chalcott" remained in use in the early 19th century for a nearby estate, formerly the Upper and Lower Chalcot Farms.

The Chalcott estate was farmed from England's Lane in Belsize Park, in the parish of Hampstead, half a mile to the north-west (first recorded as Chaldecotes in the 13th century). The estate had split into Upper and Lower Chalcot Farms by 1720, but reunited and farmed from Upper Chalcot Farmhouse around 1797. The counter argument is that Lower Chalcot Farm was not Chalk Farm as often claimed, but actually farmed from another farmhouse on England's Lane. If that argument is correct then Chalk Farm was never known as Chalcot, but probably named for the whitewashed farm buildings. Chalk has often been used as a product in whitewash. The farmhouse at Lower Chalcot was sometimes referred to as the White House.

Geography
The area is not formally defined, though the former Manor of Chalk Farm was a component part of the Ancient Parish and Borough of St Pancras. The core area lies between Chalk Farm Road in the east and St Pancras' western boundary to the west; an area that extends to Ainger Road and takes in part of the Primrose Hill open space, though the hill itself is in Hampstead.

Chalk Farm includes part of the Camden Town with Primrose Hill ward, and perhaps also part of the Haverstock ward. As of 2020, Camden's wards are being reviewed and these wards will be abolished or have their boundaries redrawn.

Neighbouring places
Primrose Hill 
Camden Town 
Regent's Park
Kentish Town
Maitland Park
St John's Wood 
Swiss Cottage

Economy

Chalk Farm equates to the northern neighbourhood of Camden Town and features many lively pubs, live music venues, and restaurants.

Within immediate reach of the tube station is The Roundhouse, a former circular railway engine turntable shed converted to 360° arts and performance use.

Chalk Farm contains Haverstock School Business & Enterprise College (formerly Haverstock Comprehensive School).

Camden College of English was in Chalk Farm

For over 70 years major bus routes were operated from Chalk Farm bus garage, in Harmood Street, now long gone. Today the long-established route 27 and the newer route 393 both terminate at Chalk Farm.  These buses reach opposite destinations outside central London: Hammersmith and Clapton respectively.

Walden Books is a long-established secondhand bookshop located just off Chalk Farm Road.

Social conditions
The south of the area has regular residents on its broadest definition, which is capable of including Jude Law, Sadie Frost and Sienna Miller among the highest-grossing early 21st century 'Camden set' of writers, artists and actors, but equally, parts of both wards have some stubborn poverty and a significant minority of their housing is social housing.

Census data for local wards gives an indication of varied social conditions in the area.

Transport

Chalk Farm on the north–south Northern line, Edgware branch.

References

Areas of London
Districts of the London Borough of Camden
Places formerly in Middlesex